"Out of My Heart (Into Your Head)" is a song by British pop rock band BBMak. It was written by the three members of the group (Christian Burns, Mark Barry, and Stephen McNally) along with songwriters Tony and Chris Griffiths. It was released in June 2002 as the lead single from their second studio album, Into Your Head (2002). The song reached number 56 on the Billboard Hot 100 and number 36 on the UK singles chart.

Background 
Writing for BBMak's follow-up album to Sooner or Later began in August 2001. "Out of My Heart (Into Your Head" was the first song the group wrote. Of the song, band member Stephen McNally said, "We wrote 'Out Of My Heart' in Liverpool with lads, the Griffiths brothers who were in a band called The Real People. It was dead easy writing this song, we did it in an hour. It was one of them things. We sat round with guitars going over melody and lyric ideas and an hour later it was done. It's about the beginning of a relationship when you're falling in love and the feeling you get when it's great".

Reception 
Chuck Taylor of Billboard wrote the song is "world pop music for 2002 at its most inspired, meshing full bodied acoustic instrumentation with radiant, masterful vocals and swirling harmonies".

Music video 
The music video was directed by Katie Bell and shot in Oak Island, North Carolina as well as Screen Gems Studios in Wilmington. It premiered on AOL Music on 28 June 2002. BBMak premiered the video on TRL on 30 July 2002. 

The video takes place at a beach party where BBMak is entertaining with friends, playing volleyball and surfing. In other scenes, BBMak is shown singing on a water-covered stage with a full band in front of a large backdrop that displays imagery of the sky and sea. The video reached the number 5 spot on TRL in August 2002.

Charts

Weekly charts

Year-end charts

References 

2002 songs
2002 singles
BBMak songs